Breweries in Indiana produce a wide range of beers in different styles that are marketed locally, regionally, and nationally. Brewing companies vary widely in the volume and variety of beer produced,  from small nanobreweries and microbreweries to massive multinational conglomerate macrobreweries.

In 2012, Indiana's 68 breweries and brewpubs employed 260 people directly, and more than 23,000 others in related jobs such as wholesaling and retailing. Including people directly employed in brewing, as well as those who supply Indiana's breweries with everything from ingredients to machinery, the total business and personal tax revenue generated by Indiana's breweries and related industries was more than $456 million. Consumer purchases of Indiana's brewery products generated almost $192 million extra in tax revenue. In 2012, according to the Brewers Association, Indiana ranked 22nd in the number of craft breweries per capita, with 54.

For context, at the end of 2013 there were 2,822 breweries in the United States, including 2,768 craft breweries subdivided into 1,237 brewpubs, 1,412 microbreweries and 119 regional craft breweries.  In that same year, according to the Beer Institute, the brewing industry employed around 2 million Americans in the brewing industry (brewing, distribution and retail) and had a combined economic impact of more than $246 billion.

Breweries and brewpubs

18th Street Brewery – Gary/Hammond – brewpub, Gary location opened in 2013; Hammond location opened in 2016; spinoff brewery called Sour Note Brewing opened in Hammond in 2018, Indianapolis taproom opened in 2020
2Toms Brewing - Fort Wayne - brewpub, opened in 2018
450 North Brewing - Columbus - brewpub, opened in 2012
Auburn Brewing - Auburn - taproom, opened in 2018
 Bad Dad Brewing Company  - Fairmount Brewpub, opened in 2017
 Bare Hands Brewery – Granger – taproom, opened in 2011
 Barley Island Brewing Company – Noblesville – brewpub, opened in 1999
 Black Acre Brewing Company – Indianapolis – taproom, opened in 2012
 Bloomington Brewing Company – Bloomington – Production brewery, opened as a brewpub in 1994, relocated brewery and Lennie’s restaurant in 2019
 Broad Ripple Brewpub – Indianapolis – brewpub, opened in 1990 - the very first Brewpub in the state of Indiana and the oldest continuously operating brewery in Indiana
 Bulldog Brewing Company – Whiting – brewpub, opened in 2011
 Burn 'Em Brewing – Michigan City – taproom, opened in 2013
 Byway Brewing – Hammond – brewpub, opened in 2016
 Carson's Brewery – Evansville – taproom, opened in 2013
 Centerpoint Brewing Company – Indianapolis – taproom, opened in 2016
 Chapman's Brewing Company – Angola – taproom, opened in 2012
Chilly Water Brewing Co. - Indianapolis - brewery opened 2014
Civilian Brewing Corps - Spencer - brewpub, opened in 2019
 Crooked Ewe Brewery – South Bend – brewpub, opened in 2015
 Crown Brewing – Crown Point – brewpub, opened in 2008
 Daredevil Brewing Company – Speedway - production brewery opened in 2011 in Shelbyville, relocated the brewery to Speedway and added a taproom in 2015
 Devil's Trumpet Brewing Company – Merrillville - taproom, opened in 2014
 Evil Czech Brewery – Mishawaka – brewpub, opened in 2014
Ellison Brewing - Indianapolis - satellite brewpub of company located in East Lansing, Michigan, opened in 2019
Fork + Ale House - Carmel - brewpub, opened in 2019
 Fortlandia Brewing - Fort Wayne - brewery, opened in 2019
Function Brewing – Bloomington – brewpub, opened in 2014
Garfield Brewery - Indianapolis - opened in 2018 
 Goshen Brewing Company – Goshen – brewpub, opened in 2015
 Guardian Brewing Company – Muncie - taproom, opened in 2015
Guggman Haus Brewing - Indianapolis - opened in 2019
Harry Stuff Brewing - Wawaka, opened in 2019
Hog Molly Brewing - Columbus - opened in 2019
 Iechyd Da Brewing – Elkhart – brewpub, opened in 2012
 Indiana City Brewing Company – Indianapolis – taproom; opened in 2013 in the old Home Brewing Company bottling building
Junk Ditch Brewing Company – Fort Wayne – brewpub, opened in 2016
Lafayette Brewing Company - Lafayette - brewpub, opened in 1993
Mad Anthony Brewing Company – Fort Wayne – brewpub, opened in 1998, several locations
Malt Brothers Brewing – St. John - brewpub, opened in 2015 as St. John Malt Brothers Craft Brewers, purchased 95ate5 brewpub and consolidated operations in 2019
MashCraft Brewing Company – Greenwood – brewpub, opened in 2014, additional locations in Indianapolis and Fishers
 Metazoa Brewing Company – Indianapolis – taproom, opened in 2016
Myriad Brewing - Evansville - brewpub, opened in 2019
 New Albanian Brewing – New Albany – brewpub, started as a restaurant in 1987; brewery operations began in 2002
 New Boswell Brewing – Richmond – taproom, opened in 2010
 New Oberpfalz Brewing – Griffith – brewpub, opened in 2015
 Our Lady of Perpetual Hops - New Albany - taproom, opened in 2019
People's Brewing – Lafayette - taproom, opened in 2009
 Primeval Brewing - Noblesville - brewpub, opened in 2019
Quaff On Brewing Company – Nashville - production brewery, opened in 2012. Brewpubs branded as "Big Woods" in Nashville, Bloomington, Franklin, Noblesville  and Speedway.
 Rad Brewing - Indianapolis - brewpub, opened in 2010 as Flat12 Bierwerks, rebranded in 2019
Red Foot Brewing – Jeffersonville – brewpub, opened in 2014, house brewery at Red Yeti
Ruhe152 - Napanee - brewpub, opened in 2019
 Salt Creek Brewery – Bedford – brewpub, opened in 2012
 Scarlet Lane Brewing - McCordsville - taproom, opened in 2014
 South Bend Brew Werks – South Bend – brewpub, opened in 2014
 Shale Creek Brewing – Franklin – brewpub, opened in 2016
 Shoreline Brewery – Michigan City – brewpub, opened in 2005
 Summit City Brewerks – Fort Wayne – brewpub, opened in 2010
 Sun King Brewing – Indianapolis/Fishers– taproom, downtown Indianapolis brewery opened in 2009, Fishers brewery opened in 2015, other locations in Broad Ripple and Carmel
 Taxman Brewing Company – Bargersville – brewpub, opened in 2014. Additional locations in Indianapolis and Fortville.
Thieme and Wagner - Lafayette - originally opened in 1863, reopened in 2016.
 Three Floyds Brewing– Munster - brewpub, brewery originally opened in Hammond in 1996 and moved to Munster in 2000.  The brewpub opened in 2005.
 Tin Man Brewing Company Kokomo – Kokomo – brewpub, opened in 2016
Triton Brewing Company - Indianapolis - opened in 2011
 Trubble Brewing – Fort Wayne – brewpub, opened in 2015
 Two Deep Brewing Company – Indianapolis – brewpub, opened in 2014
 Upland Brewing Company –Indianapolis/Bloomington- Bloomington Brewpub opened in 1998, Broad Ripple Tasting Room in 2010, Bloomington Production Brewery in 2012, Carmel Tap House in 2013, Wood Shop in Bloomington and Columbus Pump House in 2016, Fountain Square Brewery in 2019, Upland Jeffersonville in 2021, and Upland 82nd Street in Indianapolis in 2022.
Viking Artisan Ale - Griffith - production brewery, opened in 2019
 Wedgewood Brewing – Middlebury – taproom, opened in 2016
 Wildrose Brewing – Griffith – brewpub, opened in 2015
 Windmill Brewing – Dyer – taproom, opened in 2015
 Zwanzigz Pizza and Brewing – Columbus – brewpub, started as a restaurant in 2002, added brewery in 2012

Former breweries

Indianapolis Brewing Company

See also 
 Beer in the United States
 List of breweries in the United States
 List of microbreweries

References

External links
 Brewer's Guild of Indiana

Indiana
Breweries